Suzanne Murray is a former Canadian politician, who sat in the Legislative Assembly of Saskatchewan from 1991 to 1999. A member of the Saskatchewan New Democratic Party caucus, she represented the electoral districts of Qu'Appelle-Lumsden from 1991 to 1995, and Regina Qu'Appelle Valley from 1995 to 1999.

References

Living people
Saskatchewan New Democratic Party MLAs
Women MLAs in Saskatchewan
20th-century Canadian politicians
20th-century Canadian women politicians
1943 births